Fahad Ali Al-Sobeai (born 1 January 1988) is a Saudi Arabian football player who currently plays as midfielder.

External links
slstat.com Profile

1988 births
Living people
Saudi Arabian footballers
Al Nassr FC players
Najran SC players
Al-Raed FC players
Al-Shoulla FC players
Al-Qadsiah FC players
Al-Kawkab FC players
Al-Riyadh SC players
Saudi Second Division players
Saudi First Division League players
Saudi Professional League players
Association football midfielders